Robert Scott Troup CMG CIE FRS (13 December 1874 – 1 October 1939) was a British forestry expert. He spent the first part of his career in Colonial India, returning to England in 1920 to head Oxford's School of Forestry.

Education

Troup was educated at Aberdeen Grammar School and the University of Aberdeen. He then entered Cooper's Hill College, which trained engineers and forest conservators for Indian service; there he trained under William Schlich.

Career

Troup joined the Imperial Forestry Service in 1897 and was posted to Burma as a Deputy Conservator of Forests. In 1905, he was appointed Forest Economist at the new Imperial Forest Research Institute and College at Dehra Dun, India. In 1915 he was appointed Assistant Inspector-General of Forests. In 1917–1918 he also served as Controller of Timber Supplies with the Indian Munitions Board.

He ended his Imperial Forestry Service career as Inspector-General of Forests of Burma.

In 1920, Troup returned to the United Kingdom to take up the Chair of Forestry at the University of Oxford, from retiring William Schlich, under whom he had studied at Cooper's Hill. Troup was elected a Fellow of St John's College, Oxford.

From 1924 to 1935 he was founding Director of Oxford's Imperial Forestry Institute. He was elected Fellow of the Royal Society (FRS) in 1926.

He was appointed Companion of the Order of the Indian Empire (CIE) in the 1920 New Year Honours and Companion of the Order of St Michael and St George (CMG) in 1934.

Works

Troup's three-volume work The Silviculture of Indian Trees was published in 1921. He also wrote Indian Forest Utilisation, Pinus Longifolia, Silvicultural Systems, A Manual of Forest Mensuration, Forestry and State Control and Exotic Forest Trees in the British Empire (1932).

Footnotes

References
Obituary, The Times, 3 October 1939

1874 births
1939 deaths
People educated at Aberdeen Grammar School
Alumni of the Royal Indian Engineering College
Alumni of the University of Aberdeen
Imperial Forestry Service officers
Administrators in British Burma
Forestry academics
Academics of the University of Oxford
Fellows of St John's College, Oxford
Fellows of the Royal Society
Companions of the Order of St Michael and St George
Companions of the Order of the Indian Empire
History of forestry education
British foresters